Teaford is a surname of German origin, and an Americanized variant of Tiefert, Tiffert, or Differt. Notable people with the surname include:

Everett Teaford (born 1984), American baseball player
Jon C. Teaford, American historian
Taylor Morris Teaford (born 1935), American fugitive and suspected murderer

References

Surnames of German origin